Alan Sondheim is a poet, critic, musician, artist, and theorist of cyberspace from the United States.

Biography
Alan Sondheim was born in Wilkes-Barre, Pennsylvania. He holds a B.A. and M.A. in English from Brown University.  He lives with his partner, Azure Carter, in Providence, Rhode Island.

His works
Sondheim's books include the anthology Being on Line: Net Subjectivity (1997), Disorders of the Real (1988), .echo (2001), Vel (Blazevox, 2004-5), Sophia (Writers Forum, 2004), The Wayward (2004), and "Writing Under" (2012), as well as numerous other chapbooks, ebooks, and articles. Sondheim has long been associated with the Trace online writing community, and was their second virtual-writer-in-residence. His video and filmwork have been widely shown. Sondheim was an Eyebeam resident.

Sondheim co-moderates several email lists, including Cybermind, Cyberculture and Wryting. Since 1994, he has been working on the "Internet Text," a continuous meditation on philosophy, psychology, language, body, and virtuality.  His artwork can also be found within Second Life. In 1996 he was keynote speaker for the Cybermind96 Conference in Perth Western Australia - one of the world's first conferences specifically organised around an email discussion list. In 2012 he was a presenter and active participant at the CyPosium, a one-day online symposium on cyberformance.

Sondheim is the developer of the concept of codework, wherein computer code itself becomes a medium for artistic expression.

His poetico-philosophical writings deal with the notion of embodiment and presence in cyberspace, loosely based on the work of postmodern philosophers Jacques Lacan and Jacques Derrida. He explores notions of the 'abject' in the masculine and feminine online, and more recently has dealt with the machinic using the language of computer code to articulate novel forms of identity in cyberspace. His work crosses over between philosophical explorations and sound poetry and more recently he has returned to the language of music using the tonalities of a wide range of ethnic instruments. His poetry has spanned several decades ranging from avant-garde beat poetry and stream-of-consciousness of the late 60's and 70's and soundscape poetry, maturing into a complex melding of multiple representational forms.

In 2009, Sondheim was working on a book examining the phenomenology and foundations of the analog and digital, and another on developing an aesthetics of virtual realities and avatars. Sondheim's explorations included: the aesthetics of virtual environments and installations; mapping techniques using motion capture and 3D laser scanners; Buddhist philosophy and its relation to avatars and online environments; and experimental choreography.

In 2013, Alan spoke at the South By Southwest (SXSW) Interactive festival on Glitch aesthetics and techniques.

In April 2022, his book, Broken Theory was published on the Punctum Books imprint. A collection of writing fragments and ideas, the book is a complex flow of ideas, experiments, and personal reflections that reflect his interests in the somatics of theory, philosophy, and art - how the body is necessary for such cultural production. Broken Theory's preface is written by Maria Damon, and the volume contains a lengthy interview with Sondheim conducted by the art historian Ryan Whyte.

Exhibits
International Digital Media and Art Association’s  2022 Weird Media Exhibition, 2022 (Specters/Ghost Files)

The Internet Text
The Internet Text can be seen as Sondheim's major work, and was included in the first Electronic Literature Collection. Posted online since 1994, it is both an aggregate of Sondheim's writings and a "continuous meditation on cyberspace." The works are distributed on several email lists and gathered on Sondheim's website. The significance of The Internet Text is as a document or residue of Sondheim's diverse writings and performances, and also as a philosophical reflection on computer mediated communication and online culture.

References

Discography
Alan Sondheim/Ritual All 770 - The Songs (Riverboat 03) USA 1967 /reissue Fire Museum Records (FMR04) USA 2005 
Alan Sondheim - Ritual-All-7-70 (ESP-Disk' 1048) USA 1967
Alan Sondheim - T'Other Little Tune (ESP-Disk' 1082) USA 1968
Alan Sondheim - Ski/nn (Fire Museum Records FMR 07) USA 2006
Alan Sondheim - Fifty-Six (Qbico 056) Italy 2006
Alan Sondheim - Boojum (Majmua Music MM 9) USA 2008
Alan Sondheim, Helena Espvall, Azure Carter - Cauldron (Fire Museum Records FM 018) USA 2012
Alan Sondheim, Chris Diasparra, Edward Schneider - Cutting Board (ESP-Disk' 5004) USA 2014
Alan Sondheim, Azure Carter - Avatar Woman (Public Eyesore Records PE 123) USA 2014
Alan Sondheim, Stephen Dydo - Dragon and Phoenix (ESP-Disk' 5019) USA 2017
Alan Sondheim - Future Speed Future (Public Eyesore Records PE 143) USA 2019

External links
Alan Sondheim Papers, Fales Library and Special Collections at New York University Special Collections
The Alan Sondheim Mail Archive -  archive of works sent by Alan Sondheim to various mailing lists
  Electronic Conference of Poetry Report
Interview with Alan Sondheim
"Internet Text"

Electronic literature writers
American male poets
Living people
Jewish American artists
ESP-Disk artists
Jewish poets
Year of birth missing (living people)
21st-century American Jews